SS Megantic was a UK transatlantic ocean liner that was built in Ireland and launched in 1908. She was one of a pair of sister ships that were ordered in 1907 by Dominion Line but completed for White Star Line.

Before the First World War her regular route was between Liverpool and Quebec City. She and her sister  were the largest ships on the route between Great Britain and Canada.

In the First World War Megantic escaped a submarine in 1915 and was a troop ship from 1915.

Megantic was refitted in 1919 and 1924. In the 1920s and early 1930s her duties were a mixture of liner services and cruising. In 1928 Megantics regular route was between Great Britain and New York.

Megantic was laid up in 1931 and scrapped in 1933.

Background
The Dominion Line operated a transatlantic liner service between Liverpool, Quebec, Montreal and Boston. In 1902 the International Mercantile Marine Company (IMM) took over Dominion Line.

In 1905 the rival Allan Line introduced the World's first steam turbine ocean liners.  and Virginian were two of the swiftest ships on the route between Britain and Canada, and at more than  each they were also the largest. The pair made such an impression that Allan Line won a valuable Canadian Government mail contract before the ships were even launched.

But like all of the earliest turbine ships, Victorian and Virginian had direct drive from their turbines to their propellers. On Virginian this caused cavitation. Virginian also acquired a reputation for rolling excessively in heavy seas. Also, the earliest steam turbines used more bunker fuel than triple- or quadruple-expansion steam engines.

In 1907 Dominion Line responded by ordering a pair of liners from Harland and Wolff. At almost  each they would be larger than Victorian and Virginian, the largest ships in Dominion Line's fleet, and the largest ships on the route between Britain and Canada.

Dominion Line planned to call the ships Alberta and Albany. But before the pair were completed, IMM transferred them to another of its subsidiaries, White Star Line, and they were renamed to conform with White Star naming policy. Alberta was launched as Laurentic, and Albany was launched on 19 December 1908 months later as Megantic, after Lake Mégantic in Quebec.

Despite the change of owner, Laurentic and Megantic were still to serve the route between Liverpool and Montreal. They were White Star Line's first ships on the route.

Building

Harland and Wolff built Megantic on slipway number seven of its South Yard in Belfast. She was completed on 3 June 1909, less than two months after Laurentic.

Laurentic was built with experimental combination of machinery which had a triple Propeller arrangement of a central turbine, and two four-cylinder triple-expansion engines that drove the port and starboard propellers, the exhaust steam from their low-pressure cylinders powered the turbine.

However, Megantic was built with a conventional twin propeller installation driven by conventional quadruple-expansion engines, to provide a direct comparison with Laurentic.

Laurentic produced 20 percent more power than Megantic for the same coal consumption. For the same power output, Laurentics coal consumption was 12 to 15 percent less than Megantics. This led IMM to specify a similar combination of two triple-expansion engines and one low-pressure turbine for the s that Harland and Wolff launched in 1910 and 1911.

As built, Megantic had berths for 230 first class passengers, 430 second class and 1,000 third class.

Service
The White Star and Dominion Lines provided two ships each to run a weekly joint service between Liverpool and Canada. The White Star ships were Laurentic and Megantic. The Dominion Line ships were the  Canada and  Dominion. On 17 June 1909 Megantic left Liverpool on her maiden voyage.

In July 1910 Metropolitan Police DCI Walter Dew arrested murder suspect Hawley Harvey Crippen and his lover Ethel Le Neve at Rimouski aboard the Canadian Pacific liner . Dew repatriated Crippen and Le Neve to Britain aboard Megantic, reaching Liverpool on 28 August.

By 1911 Megantic was equipped for wireless telegraphy, operating on the 300 and 600 metre wavelengths. Her call sign was MZC. In March 1911 Megantics Marconi Company wireless operator transmitted a signal 2,500 miles across the Atlantic to Poldhu Wireless Station in Cornwall. Previously the maximum range of Marconi transmitters aboard ships was thought to be about 600 miles.

When the First World War began in 1914, White Star Line briefly put Megantic on its route between Liverpool and New York. On 30 May 1915 she was on a westbound voyage from Liverpool to Montreal when a submarine chased her off the south coast of Ireland. The liner safely outpaced the submarine.

On 6 April 1917 Megantic was requisitioned for government service. She became a troop ship and carried members of the Canadian Expeditionary Force (CEF) and United States Armed Forces. After the Armistice she repatriated members of the CEF and First Australian Imperial Force.

1919 refit
In 1919 Megantic was refitted at Belfast. Her first class accommodation was increased to 325 berths, and her second and third class were reduced to 260 and 550 berths respectively. White Star Line returned Megantic to her Liverpool – Canada route, with Dominion Line's Canada as her running mate. In the off season she made cruises to the West Indies.

In January 1920 Megantic made one voyage on White Star's joint service with Shaw, Savill & Albion Line, whose main route was between Britain and New Zealand. Later in 1920 she made one voyage to Sydney and Wellington in government service.

1924 refit
In 1924 Megantics first class accommodation was converted into 452 "cabin class" berths. In January 1927 the Admiralty chartered her and had her fitted out as a troop ship to take Royal Marines to Shanghai.

In February 1928 Megantic made a Caribbean cruise that included a call at La Guaira in Venezuela. In March, White Star Line put her on the London – Le Havre – Halifax – New York route until the Saint Lawrence River thawed, and then transferred her to the route to Quebec and Montreal.

In May 1929 Megantic was in King George V Dock, London when fire broke out in her number two hold. The hold was flooded to extinguish the fire.

By 1930 Megantics navigation equipment included wireless direction finding. In 1930 and 1931 she operated economy cruises.

On 20 July 1931 the Royal Mail Case opened at the Old Bailey, which led to the collapse of White Star Line's parent company. Megantic was laid up in the Firth of Clyde off Rothesay.

The sale was controversial because Japan was at war in Manchuria, and UK public opinion feared Japan could use the two liners as troop ships. Megantic was sold that January, arrived at Osaka on 7 May and was broken up at Kobe.

References

Bibliography

External links

 – sailing schedules, several including Megantic

1908 ships
Maritime incidents in 1915
Ocean liners of the United Kingdom
Ships built in Belfast
Ships built by Harland and Wolff
Steamships of the United Kingdom
Troop ships of the United Kingdom
World War I passenger ships of the United Kingdom